Hatu-Builico, officially Hatu-Builico Administrative Post, is an administrative post (and was formerly a subdistrict) in Ainaro municipality, East Timor. Its seat or administrative centre is Mulo.

References

External links 

  – information page on Ministry of State Administration site 

Administrative posts of East Timor
Ainaro Municipality